The 1992 IIHF Asian Oceanic Junior U18 Championship was the ninth edition of the IIHF Asian Oceanic Junior U18 Championship. It took place between 16 and 22 March 1992 in Harutori, Japan. The tournament was won by Japan, who claimed their seventh title by finishing first in the standings. North Korea and China finished second and third respectively.

Standings

Fixtures
Reference

References

External links
International Ice Hockey Federation

IIHF Asian Oceanic U18 Championships
Asian
International ice hockey competitions hosted by Japan